Salempur is a village development committee in Sarlahi District of Province No.2 in the Janakpur Zone of south-eastern Nepal. At the time of the 1991 Nepal census, it had a population of 5,252 people living in 876 individual households.
And have two madarsa with two masjid.
There have 100 houses of Muslim communities.  Salempur is famous for Chameli Maai where devotees from many districts visit, including part of India.

References

External links
UN map of the municipalities of Sarlahi  District

Populated places in Sarlahi District